Bhool is a 2014 Pakistani soap series that aired on Hum TV. It is directed by Asad Mumtaz Malik while written by veteran writer and poet Syed Wasi Shah. Series was produced by Momina Duraid at Gemstone Productions. It stars Sanam Chaudhry, Sarah Khan, Behroze Sabzwari, Fazila Qazi, Shehroz Sabzwari, Saleem Sheikh and Farah Shah in pivot roles. At 3rd Hum Awards series was nominated Best Soap Actor for Shehroz Sabzwari, Best Soap Actress for Sanam Chaudhry and Best Soap Series for Momina Duraid which she ultimately won for another production of hers Susraal Mera. This show was a popular daily series for HUM TV, leading in the timeslot.

Outline
The story is set against a backdrop of political intrigue revolving around a family that suffers from love, hate, selfishness and deceit. Sardar Jahanzaib is a political leader who kills his second wife for political gains. The murder results in a psychologically devastated daughter Hira. There is also a parallel track in which Ayaz and Nadia, hailing from two opposing political camps, run away from their families to get married. Ayaz's father forgives him and introduces the couple to his close friend Sardar Jahanzaib where they meet Hira. Their fate depends upon the relation they carry throughout their lives.

Cast
 Haya Sehgal as hira's stepmother- main antagonist
 Fazila Qazi as Nadia's mother
 Mazhar Ali   as the old creepy man who kidnap Shazan and Nadia's daughter
 Zainab Qayyum "ZQ" as Annie, Hira's mom
 Sarah Khan as Nadia- female protagonist
 Anas Aleem Hira's bad  maid
 Sanam Chaudhry as Hira - female antagonist
 Behroze Sabzwari as Nadia's father
 Shehroz Sabzwari as Shazan - male protagist
 Saleem Sheikh as Hira's father
Anas Ali Imran as Rashid

Accolades 

At 3rd Hum Awards soap was nominated for following nominations:

 Best Soap Actor - Shehroz Sabzwari (nom) 
 Best Soap Actress - Sanam Chaudhry (nom)
 Best Soap Series - Momina Duraid (nom)

References

External links
 official website 
 
 

2014 Pakistani television series debuts
2014 Pakistani television series endings
Pakistani drama television series
Urdu-language television shows
Hum TV original programming